Kim Dae-jin may refer to:
Kim Dae-jin (pianist) (born 1962), South Korean pianist
Kim Dae-jin (actor) (born 1977), South Korean actor